Michele Arcari (born 9 June 1981) is an Italian football midfielder.

References

External links
Career profile (from aic.it) 

1981 births
People from Cuneo
Living people
Italian footballers
Association football midfielders
Brescia Calcio players
U.C. AlbinoLeffe players
Spezia Calcio players
U.S. Sassuolo Calcio players
A.C. Prato players
Empoli F.C. players
S.S. Juve Stabia players
S.E.F. Torres 1903 players
Footballers from Piedmont
Sportspeople from the Province of Cuneo